The 2019–20 Biathlon World Cup – Stage 4 was the fourth event of the season and is held in Oberhof, Germany, from 9 to 12 January 2020.

Schedule of events 
The events took place at the following times.

Medal winners

Men

Women

Notes

References 

Biathlon World Cup - Stage 4, 2019-20
2019–20 Biathlon World Cup
Biathlon World Cup - Stage 4
Biathlon competitions in Germany
Sport in Oberhof, Germany